Impact X Capital is a venture capital firm which looks to invest in underrepresented entrepreneurs from across Europe. Impact X Capital was started by Eric Collins. Its initial founding members include Ursula Burns, Ric Lewis and Lenny Henry.

History 
Impact X Capital was started in 2018 by Eric Collins. Its initial founding members include Ursula Burns, Ric Lewis and Lenny Henry. The venture capital (VC) fund was inspired by the lack of investment in companies led by people from underrepresented communities, with a particular focus on people of colour and women. At the time they were founded, less than 4% of VC funding went to teams led by women, and less than 1% to people of colour. As of December 2019, Impact X was raising a fund of over £100 million to invest in minority-led businesses.

Team 
The chief executive officer is Eric Collins, a tech entrepreneur and investor who previously served on Barack Obama's Small Business Administration's Council on Underserved Communities. Principal investor, Yvonne Bajela, was selected as one of Forbes 30 Under 30 in 2020. In April 2020, Paula Groves, founding partner, was selected as one of Europe's most influential women in venture capital. Principal investor and chief technology officer, Ezechi Britton was awarded ITA's venture capitalist of the year in 2019.

Major investments 
One of the first Impact X Capital investments was Predina, a smart navigation software which looks to prevent road traffic accidents. Predina was founded by Bola Adegbulu and Meha Nelson, and makes use of artificial intelligence to predict the safest routes for any car journey.

References 

Venture capital firms
British venture capitalists
Venture capital firms of the United Kingdom
Financial services companies based in London
Financial services companies established in 2018
2018 establishments in England